Zokors are Asiatic burrowing rodents resembling mole-rats. They include two genera: Myospalax and Eospalax.  Zokors are native to much of China, Kazakhstan, and Siberian Russia.

Traditionally, zokors were thought to be closely related to either hamsters (Cricetinae) or voles (Arvicolinae), but recent molecular phylogenetic studies have demonstrated they are more closely related to blind mole-rats (Spalacinae) and root and bamboo rats (Rhizomyinae) in the family Spalacidae.  It appears that one of the first important evolutionary splits in muroid rodents is between burrowing forms and nonburrowing forms.

Unlike the other spalacids, which primarily use their incisors, zokors use their powerful front claws for digging.  They have small eyes and no external ears.  Zokors feed on plant matter such as tubers and seeds.

Zokor bone is sometimes used as a more environmentally friendly alternative to tiger bone in traditional Chinese medicine.  This product is called sailonggu.

Taxonomy
Subfamily Myospalacinae
Genus Myospalax
Myospalax myospalax species group
False zokor, M. aspalax
Siberian zokor, M. myospalax
Myospalax psilurus species group
Transbaikal zokor, M. psilurus
Genus Eospalax
Chinese zokor, E. fontanierii
Rothschild's zokor, E. rothschildi
Smith's zokor, E. smithii

References

Jansa, S. A. and M. Weksler. 2004. Phylogeny of muroid rodents: relationships within and among major lineages as determined by IRBP gene sequences.  Molecular Phylogenetics and Evolution, 31:256-276.
Musser, G. G. and M. D. Carleton. 2005. Superfamily Muroidea. pp. 894–1531 in Mammal Species of the World a Taxonomic and Geographic Reference. D. E. Wilson and D. M. Reeder eds. Johns Hopkins University Press, Baltimore
Norris, R. W., K. Y. Zhou, C. Q. Zhou, G. Yang, C. W. Kilpatrick, and R. L. Honeycutt. 2004. The phylogenetic position of the zokors (Myospalacinae) and comments on the families of muroids (Rodentia). Molecular Phylogenetics and Evolution, 31:972-978.
Nowak, R. M. 1999. Walker's Mammals of the World, Vol. 2. Johns Hopkins University Press, London.

Spalacidae
Mammal subfamilies
Rodents of China
Mammals of Siberia
Fauna of Kazakhstan
Rodents of Asia